Funa latisinuata is a species of sea snail, a marine gastropod mollusk in the family Pseudomelatomidae, the turrids and allies.

Description
The length of the shell attains 50 mm, its diameter 35 mm.

The fusiform and turreted shell contains 12 whorls. These are excavated above, carinated and angulated in the middle and below the angle obliquely plicated. The upper half of each whorl is nearly smooth, as the plications extend scarcely beyond the central large spiral liration which marks the angulation of the whorls. Sometimes, this lira being double, the whorls are less acutely angular. The color is yellowish brown, with white revolving lirae. The siphonal  canal is moderately long and slightly curved.

Distribution
This species occurs in the China seas and off the Andaman Islands.

References

 Smith E.A. (1877). Diagnoses of new species of Pleurotomidae in the British Museum. Annals and Magazine of Natural History. ser. 4, 19: 488-501
 Taylor, J. D. (1982). Diets of sublittoral predatory gastropods of Hong Kong. In: Proceedings of the first international marine biological workshop: The marine flora and fauna of Hong Kong and southern China (ed. Morton, B.), vol. 2, pp907-920. Hong Kong University Press, Hong Kong
 Li B.Q., Kilburn R.N., & Li X.Z. (2010). Report on Crassispirinae Morrison, (Mollusca: Neogastropoda: Turridae) from the China Seas. Journal of Natural History. 44, 699-740
 Liu J.Y. [Ruiyu] (ed.). (2008). Checklist of marine biota of China seas. China Science Press. 1267 pp

External links
 

latisinuata
Gastropods described in 1877